The 1968 Illinois Fighting Illini football team was an American football team that represented the University of Illinois during the 1968 Big Ten Conference football season. In their second year under head coach Jim Valek, the Illini compiled a 1–9 record and finished in a tie for eighth place in the Big Ten Conference.

The team's offensive leaders were quarterback Bob Naponic with 813 passing yards, running back Rich Johnson with 973 rushing yards, and wide receiver Doug Dieken with 223 receiving yards. Fullback Rich Johnson was selected as the team's most valuable player.

Schedule

Roster

References

Illinois
Illinois Fighting Illini football seasons
Illinois Fighting Illini football